Laurel Canyon: A Place in Time is a two-part documentary television series directed by Alison Ellwood. It is executive-produced by Frank Marshall; Darryl Frank and Justin Falvey, Amblin Television; Craig Kallman and Mark Pinkus, Warner Music Entertainment; Alex Gibney, Stacey Offman and Richard Perello, Jigsaw Productions; and Jeff Pollack. It premiered in two parts on Epix on May 31, 2020 and June 7, 2020.

Summary
Each episode depicts the music scene that arose in the Los Angeles neighborhood of the same name, where many legendary artists inhabited and gathered beginning in the late 1960s. Central to the narrative are photography collections and narration from Canyon photographers Henry Diltz and Nurit Wilde.

Episodes

Musicians 

The documentary features music from artists including Crosby, Stills, Nash & Young, Joni Mitchell, The Doors, The Byrds, Eagles (although they didn't live in Laurel Canyon) and more. It also includes original interviews with Bonnie Raitt, Linda Ronstadt, Don Henley, Michelle Phillips, Graham Nash, Roger McGuinn and others.

Accolades

References 

2020s American documentary television series
2020 American television series debuts
American documentary television films
Documentary films about pop music and musicians
Television series by Amblin Entertainment
Television series by MGM Television
Television shows set in Los Angeles
Television series set in the 1960s